Ferrol Naval Base also known as the Arsenal of Ferrol is a military base and arsenal of the Spanish Navy located in Ferrol, Spain. It is the main Spanish naval base on the Atlantic.

History
The first warships arrived in the Ría de Ferrol in the 16th century, during the reign of the House of Austria. It was not until 1724 when Felipe V, of the House of Bourbon, established Ferrol as the main port of the Atlantic.

Major development and expansion of the shipyards and arsenal began in the 1740s and 1750s. Initial proposals were drawn up under Minister of the Navy José Patiño, and executed by his successor, Zenón de Somodevilla y Bengoechea, Marquis de la Ensenadahe, appointed Minister of the Navy in 1743. The first ship, the San Fernando, was launched in 1751. By then twelve ships could be being built simultaneously. King Charles III was particularly interested in the navy, and in 1790, during his reign, the arsenal at Ferrol was largely completed, with a workforce of 5,440 men and a capacity to maintain 70 ships.

Technological developments during the Industrial Revolution led to the establishment of the School of Machinists and the School of Naval Engineers in 1850, during the reign of Isabel II. A steam engine workshop was also established. At the beginning of the 20th century, the first Spanish battleships, the España class, were built in Ferrol. By 1912 the shipyards of Ferrol were primarily building battleships and cruisers, while destroyers and submarines were built in Cartagena.

The Ferrol naval base was substantially modernized during the twentieth century. The Navy Marine Corps Barracks were built; as were the Electricity and Electronics Workshop and new warehouses. New facilities for docks 1 and 2 were constructed, as was a Cannon Workshop. The docks have been expanded, and vessels can be moored around the basin. In 2003 dock 5 was enlarged to fit the Álvaro de Bazán-class frigates. In 2013 the Naval Archive of Ferrol was inaugurated.

Ships

 Álvaro de Bazán-class frigates
 Álvaro de Bazán
 Almirante Juan de Borbón
 Blas de Lezo
 Méndez Núñez
 Cristóbal Colón
 Serviola-class patrol boats
 Serviola
 Centinela
 Vigía
 Atalaya
 Replenishment oilers
 Patiño
 Cantabria
 Patrol ships
 Cabo Fradera

See also
 List of ships built at Ferrol shipyards 1750 – 1881
 Rota Naval Base
 Las Palmas Naval Base
 Cartagena Naval Base

References

Military installations of Spain
Spanish Navy bases
Ferrol, Spain
Bien de Interés Cultural landmarks in the Province of A Coruña